Yelkibayevo (Yılqıbay) is a rural locality (a village) in Ufa, Bashkortostan, Russia. The population was 61 as of 2010. There are 3 streets.

Geography 
Yelkibayevo is located 21 km southeast of Ufa. Fyodorovka is the nearest rural locality.

References 

Rural localities in Ufa urban okrug